Hazleton Township is one of sixteen townships in Buchanan County, Iowa, USA.  As of the 2000 census, its population was 1,733.

Geography 

The unincorporated community of Bryantsburg is also located in the township. According to the USGS, it contains five cemeteries: Floral Hills Memorial Gardens, Fontana, Hazleton, Kint and Saint Marys.

References

External links 

 US-Counties.com
 City-Data.com

Townships in Buchanan County, Iowa
Townships in Iowa